Qulbəndə (also, Gülbəndə and Gyul’benda) is a village and municipality in the Agdash Rayon of Azerbaijan. It has a population of 1,315. The municipality consists of the villages of Qulbəndə, Orta Qəsil, Bəylik, and Aşağı Qəsil.

References 

Populated places in Agdash District